The Wright Contour was a coach body built by Wrightbus from 1982 until 1987. The first entered service with Whittles in 1983. Most were fitted to Bedford Y series, but others were seven Leyland Tigers for Ulsterbus, one Ford R1115 and one ACE Puma IV midicoach.

In 1987, a high-floor version marketed as the Contour Imperial was built on a Volvo B10M chassis, however production of the Contour then ceased.

During the 1980s Wright was not yet a major player in the UK bus market, and most of its sales were to the welfare sector.  The Contour was an attempt to break into the coach market, but only 37 Contours were built over 5 years, prompting Wright to withdraw from the coach market.

References

External links

Flickr gallery

Vehicles introduced in 1982
Contour